Mikhail Kolyadko (born 30 November 1987) is a Belarusian professional footballer who plays for Belshina Bobruisk.

Career
Born in Minsk, Kolyadko began playing football in FC Minsk youth system. He joined the senior team where he made his Belarusian Premier League debut in the 2007 season.

In 2017 play in FK Atlantas Klaipėda. In summer 2018 went from Atlantas to FK Kauno Žalgiris.

Kolyadko has made appearances for the Belarus national under-17 football team and Belarus national under-19 football team.

References

External links 
 
 
 Profile at Dinamo Brest website

1987 births
Living people
Belarusian footballers
Association football midfielders
Belarusian expatriate footballers
Expatriate footballers in Poland
Expatriate footballers in Lithuania
FC Minsk players
Olimpia Elbląg players
FC Dynamo Brest players
FC Kommunalnik Slonim players
FC Baranovichi players
FC Gomel players
FC Gorodeya players
FC Rechitsa-2014 players
FK Atlantas players
FK Kauno Žalgiris players
FC Slavia Mozyr players
FC Krumkachy Minsk players
FC Belshina Bobruisk players